Samuel Bilewu Joseph Oshoffa (October 11, 1909 – September 10, 1985) was the founder of the Celestial Church of Christ after reportedly resurrecting people from the dead. He founded the church in 1947 after being lost for three months near Porto-Novo in Benin. The church now has its main offices in Bénin and Nigeria. Five percent, or 400,000, of the 8 million people of Benin are Celestial Christians. Oshoffa was reported to have had 14 wives and 54 children when he died in 1985  although some say these figures are high.

Biography
Samuel Bilewu Joseph Oshoffa (Ojú kìí ṣe ọfà) was born on October 11, 1909 in Porto Novo, capital of the French colony of Dahomey (now the Republic of Benin) into a Yoruba family of mixed religion. His father, Joseph Oshoffa, was a Muslim but become a Methodist, whilst his mother, Alake Iyafo, from the town of Imeko,  followed traditional religions but objected to Christianity. His family was a member of the Cherubim and Seraphim Church and not Samuel Bilewu Joseph Oshoffa himself.

His mother left him when he was only three months old to return to Imeko, Nigeria where her husband lived. His father was a carpenter (a fact which was later thought important to a person who later reported receiving visits from Jesus Christ). He married his first wife, Felicia Yaman and she was involved with the launch of the new church. She was said to be able to prophesy conflict and was invited to many of Oshoffa's meetings.

Revelation
Oshoffa was working in the ebony trade in 1947 when he was instructed to found the new church. He reported that he had been searching in the forests to find the correct type of tree. He said he lost his way and had to live off the land for three months. When he emerged he was empowered with the gifts of healing and prophecy.

His first act of healing was reportedly the resurrection of his nephew. As a result, his elder sister, Elizabeth, was the first convert. The nephew was to become recognised as the first prophet of the new church. Over the next few years, several other people were reportedly brought back from the dead by Oshoffa. Between 1947 and 1951, the church grew in the country of Benin. In 1976, it was relocated to Nigeria because Oshoffa was in a minor conflict with the government of Benin. This was timely as he was just about to be arrested. Very soon after arriving in Nigeria, Oshoffa cured a mad woman, although many people doubted this account. Oshoffa held a public meeting in Yaba, Lagos, where those gathered reported his ability to prophecy. In the same year he again claimed a resurrection.

The new church grew rapidly,  and it gained followers across West Africa and the world. The church was estimated to have several million followers in 1998. In Nigeria, Oshoffa was sold a large piece of land after the owner was assisted by a "holy man's" intervention in a dream with a legal dispute. The new church continued to receive resistance from the Nigerian authorities, but it was officially recognised in 1958. He took on two partners for the church, Reverends Alexander Abiodun Bada and Samuel Ajanlekoko.

Death
Oshoffa died on 10 September 1985 after being involved in a car accident where everyone in the car died. He was buried at Celestial City, Imeko.

Oshoffa was the sole source of authority for the church and because of this, his death caused some problems of succession. 
After some confusion, Alexander Abiodun Adebayo Bada was appointed his successor by the church trustees. Nigeria is considered a diocese of the worldwide church, with supreme headquarters at Porto-Novo. Therefore, Benoit Agbaosi would be appointed by the supreme headquarters leaders to lead the church.

In the beginning, those who became leaders of Celestial Church of Christ parishes were appointed by the Pastor Founder Reverend S.B.J. Oshoffa. A church is called a parish and the spiritual leader of the parish is called a shepherd. To be a shepherd of a parish, one must be called through spiritual revelation. After the revelation was confirmed, the would-be shepherd was required to serve as an apprentice under established shepherds. As the church grew, it became necessary to establish some form of training system for the clergy.  A seminary to train shepherds was established for male clergy a year after Oshoffa's death.

Porto-Novo, the supreme headquarters, chose Benoit D. AGBAOSSI (1931-2010) to succeed the Founder.
The church celebrated the 100-year anniversary of its founder's birth with a music festival and had awarded prizes in memory of him in Benin. Five percent of the 8,000,000 population of Oshoffa's home country of Benin were Celestial Christians in 2009.

References

1909 births
1985 deaths
Burials in Ogun State
Founders of new religious movements
Nigerian Christian religious leaders
People from Porto-Novo
Road incident deaths in Nigeria
Yoruba Christian clergy